Dubljević is a Montenegrin surname. Notable people with this surname include:

 Aleksandar Dubljević (born 1985), Montenegrin soccer player.
 Bojan Dubljević (born 1991), Montenegrin basketball player.
 Jelena Dubljević (born 1987), Montenegrin female basketball player.

See also
 

Montenegrin surnames